The Alma Rišaia Rba or Diwan Alma Rišaia Rabbā ("The Great Supreme World" or "The Great First World") is a Mandaean religious text. The text is used for Mandaean priestly initiation ceremonies. It is written as a scroll. The Alma Rišaia Rba complements the Alma Rišaia Zuṭa, or "The Smaller Supreme World", a related Mandaic text used for priestly rituals.

Manuscripts and translations
An English translation of the text was published by E. S. Drower in 1963, which was based on manuscript 41 of the Drower Collection (abbreviated DC 41). The manuscript consists of 8 parts. It was copied in 1224 A.H. (1809 or 1810 A.D.). The DC 41 manuscript contains an illustration with Qolasta prayer 79 in scrambled form, and the text also has a scrambled version of Qolasta prayer 82 (which is also quoted in the Book 4 of the Right Ginza).

Add. 23,602B, Kholasta sive liturgica Sabiorum Libri Joannis Fragmenta Mendaice is a book of fragments that was probably obtained by Colonel John George Taylor. It contains fragments of Maṣbuta ḏ-Hibil Ziua and Alma Rišaia Rba.

Prayer sequence

In Alma Rišaia Rba, the prescribed sequence of Qolasta prayers (numbered below according to Drower's 1959 Canonical Prayerbook) to be recited is as follows.

See also
Alma Rišaia
Alma Rišaia Zuṭa
The Coronation of the Great Shishlam
Scroll of Exalted Kingship
The Thousand and Twelve Questions

References

External links
Full text at Archive.org
Alma Rishaia Rba (Mandaic text from the Mandaean Network)
Alma Rishaia Rba (Mandaic text from the Mandaean Network)

Mandaean texts